The 2001–02 season of the Philippine Basketball League (PBL).

2001-02 Challenge Cup

ICTSI-La Salle and Shark Power Boosters battled in a sudden death playoff for an outright semifinals berth along with Welcoat Paints. ANA Freezers and Montaña collide for the last quarterfinals slot.

Finals

Shark Energy Drink and Welcoat Paints battled for the fourth straight time in the finals series, the Energy Drink Kings retained the Challenge Cup title with a 4-1 series victory, winning Game five in overtime, 64-58. After the finals, Welcoat co-team owner Raymund Yu confirmed that the Paintmasters will take a leave of absences for two conferences before resuming its PBL campaign.

Individual awards
Challenge Cup
 Most Valuable Player: Yancy De Ocampo (Welcoat)
 Sportsmanship Award:  Dondon Mendoza (ANA Freezers)
 Most Improved Player Award: Gary David (Montaña)
 Finals MVP: Warren Ybañez (Shark) 
 Mythical Five
 Yancy De Ocampo (Welcoat)
 Chester Tolomia (Shark)
 Renren Ritualo (Welcoat)
 Warren Ybañez (Shark)
 Allan Salangsang (Welcoat)

2002 Chairman's Cup

The RP Nationals didn't win a single game in all their outings against the 8 regular ballclubs.

Kutitap grabs the last semifinals slot following a victory over John-O in a do-or-die game.

Ana Freezers were actually tied with Shark and Kutitap with a 6-5 won-loss slates but were eliminated via lower quotient.

Finals

Ateneo-Hapee add another chapter to its rich and colorful basketball history, joining the elite list of PBL champions by winning their finals series over Blu Sun Power. Enrico Villanueva was voted the conference Most Valuable Player and finals MVP. Villanueva powered his way to 24 points in the title-clinching Game four. Ateneo coach Joel Banal, coaching the Blue Eagles for the first time, thank the Ateneo Alumni for their unbelievable support, other Eagles who did their share for the championship victory includes Rich Alvarez, Larry Fonacier, Celino Cruz and Gec Chia.

References

External links
 www.philippinebasketball.ph

Philippine Basketball League seasons
PBL
League
League